The Henry Varnum Poor House, also known as "Crow House," is a historic home located on South Mountain Road at New City in Rockland County, New York. It was built between about 1920 and 1949 by artist Henry Varnum Poor (1887–1970).  It combines elements of rustic Arts and Crafts Movement vernacular with elements of the Modern movement.  Also on the property are a studio dated to 1957; a small half-timbered mill building, 1921; woodshop, ca. 1920–1930; an outdoor kiln from 1957; bridge, ca. 1950; and a terraced garden, 1926.

It was listed on the National Register of Historic Places in 2007. About the same time the town of Ramapo purchased the house for $1.3 million with help of a $496,000 grant from the New York State. There were also plans for contribution of furnishings and art from family heir Peter Varnum Poor, but thereafter, collections and restoration efforts barely moved or slid back through at least 2015.

See also

National Register of Historic Places listings in Rockland County, New York

References

External links
Henry Varnum Poor Foundation

Houses on the National Register of Historic Places in New York (state)
Houses in Rockland County, New York
American Craftsman architecture in New York (state)
Modernist architecture in New York (state)
National Register of Historic Places in Rockland County, New York